Tierra de Badajoz is a comarca in the  province of Badajoz in the autonomous community of Extremadura, western Spain. The majority of its population, amounting to around 177,000 inhabitants, lives in the capital, the municipality of Badajoz, and the immediate surrounding area.

Geography

Location
The comarca is situated in the northwestern part of the province, bordering to the north with the neighbouring province of Cáceres. It borders Portugal to the west, Tierra de Mérida - Vegas Bajas to the east, and Llanos de Olivenza and Tierra de Barros to the south.

Municipalities
Alburquerque
Badajoz
La Albuera
La Codosera
Guadiana del Caudillo
Pueblonuevo del Guadiana
San Vicente de Alcántara
Talavera la Real
Valdelacalzada
Villar del Rey

References

External links

Profile 

Comarcas of Extremadura
Province of Badajoz